Allen Hall may refer to:

 Allen Hall Seminary, London, United Kingdom
 Allen Hall (University of Pittsburgh), United States
 Allen Hall (University of Oregon), United States; see Campus of the University of Oregon
 Allen Hall Theatre, University of Otago, New Zealand
Allen Hall (special effects artist) (born 1946), American special effects artist

See also
 Allan Hall (disambiguation)